Tibialis is an adjectival form of tibia. It may refer to:

Anatomy
 Tibialis anterior artery
 Tibialis anterior muscle
 Tibialis posterior artery
 Tibialis posterior muscle

Biology
 Chasmina tibialis, a species of moth
 Myromexocentrus tibialis, a species of beetle
 Pelatachina tibialis, a species of fly
 Zygoballus tibialis, a species of jumping spider

See also
 Tibial (disambiguation)
 Tbilisi, Georgia